The 2018 Copa LP Chile Hacienda Chicureo was a professional tennis tournament played on outdoor clay courts. It was the second edition of the tournament and was part of the 2018 ITF Women's Circuit. It took place in Colina, Chile, on 5–11 November 2018.

Singles main draw entrants

Seeds 

 1 Rankings as of 29 October 2018.

Other entrants 
The following players received a wildcard into the singles main draw:
  Bianca Lía Antican González
  Fernanda Labraña
  Daniela López
  Ivania Martinich

The following players received entry from the qualifying draw:
  Zoë Kruger
  Carla Lucero
  Vanda Lukács
  Luisa Stefani

Champions

Singles

 Xu Shilin def.  Paula Ormaechea, 7–5, 6–3

Doubles

 Quinn Gleason /  Luisa Stefani def.  Bárbara Gatica /  Rebeca Pereira, 6–0, 4–6, [10–7]

External links 
 2018 Copa LP Chile Hacienda Chicureo at ITFtennis.com
 Official website 

2018 ITF Women's Circuit
2018 in Chilean tennis
Tennis tournaments in Chile